Alan "Al" Kaprielian is a meteorologist in New Hampshire.  He is best known for the 20+ years he has spent at Channel 50, a broadcast television station in Derry, New Hampshire. One journalist described him as a Kult of Kaprielian due to his distinctive voice and eccentric mannerisms, which included squeaky, high-pitched exclamations of "high pressure!" and "good evening!"; a distinct New England accent; sound effects reminiscent of Curly Howard; swinging his arms in circles rapidly and performing jumping jacks on camera. At one point  during the Christmas season of 1999 the station even offered up Al Kaprielian tree ornaments. 

Kaprielian's run at the station began in 1983 and survived several changes in station ownership. The run was interrupted on December 31, 2009 when, as part of many changes at the station, Kaprielian as well as most other on-air talent at the station was let go. Kaprielian found employment doing forecasts for Manchester Public Television Service (local access), the online site of the Nashua Telegraph newspaper, and radio station WCAP-AM (980) in Lowell, Massachusetts. After yet another change in ownership at the station, Kaprielian returned to Channel 50 in August 2012, doing hourly updates from 2pm to 9pm.

As of 2015, Kaprielian is no longer with WBIN-TV; he currently forecasts for WLMW radio in Manchester, New Hampshire.

When not broadcasting weather information he tours local schools. During these visits, he teaches students about science and meteorology. He can also be found at local community events such as the Lowell Folk Festival, the Dracut Scholarship Foundation's Telethon, and the Derry News Cookie Eating Contest. He was also a feature celebrity judge at the 2009 Hampton Beach Seafood Festival, and attends the festival each year.

Biography
Kaprielian, born July 7, 1961, is a native of Natick, Massachusetts. He graduated from Lyndon State College, Lyndonville, Vermont. He currently resides in Merrimack, New Hampshire.

Kaprielian was awarded the "Best Weather Forecaster" in the Nashua Telegraph's 2004 Reader's Choice Awards. He has also been voted Best Media Personality and Best Weatherperson in New Hampshire Magazine's, The Very Best of New Hampshire Reader Choice Awards.

References

External links
Good Eeeevening!: A Perspective on New Hampshire Meteorologist Al Kaprielian
The Kult of Al Kaprielian - The Boston Phoenix

1961 births
Living people
Lyndon State College alumni
American people of Armenian descent
American television meteorologists